A NATO summit  is a summit meeting that is regarded as a periodic opportunity for heads of state and heads of government of NATO member countries to evaluate and provide strategic direction for Alliance activities.

NATO summits are not regular meetings like the more frequent NATO ministerial meetings, but rather are important junctures in the alliance's decision-making process on the highest level. Summits are often used to introduce new policy, invite new members into the alliance, launch major new initiatives, and build partnerships with non-NATO countries.

Participating Countries

The following list shows each NATO member state have taken part in every NATO Summit, the first NATO summit held in 1957:

List of NATO summits

From the founding of NATO in 1949, there have been a total of thirty-one NATO summits; the last of which was the Brussels summit held in June 2021. Only the traditional summits have received an official number, thereby excluding the exceptional summits of 2001 in NATO headquarters and of March 2022 in Brussels.

The next NATO summit will be held in Vilnius, Lithuania from 11 to 12 July 2023.

See also   

 EU summit
 G7 summit

References 

 NATO summit